Darvils (also Crimea, Darville, Darvilles) is an unincorporated community in Dinwiddie County, Virginia, United States.

Notes

Unincorporated communities in Dinwiddie County, Virginia
Unincorporated communities in Virginia